Aleksandr Petrovich Burago was an officer of the Russian Imperial army.  Serving as a captain under Joseph Vladimirovich Gourko, he commanded the force that liberated Plovdiv from the Ottoman rule on 16 January 1878. Later on Burago became a colonel.  He died of tuberculosis at the age of 30, in 1883, on Madeira, and was buried in the Alexander Nevsky Lavra in Saint Petersburg.

In recognition of his "excellence demonstrated in the battle ... whereupon, together with a squadron of dragoons, having crossed the Maritsa river ... entered the city, still occupied by the Turkish division ... an almost 25 times greater in numbers enemy force", Burago was awarded the Order of St. George of the 4th degree.

Citizens of Plovdiv traditionally honour captain Burago annually on January 16, the anniversary of the liberation of the city. Wreaths and floral tributes are brought to the monument to Burago in the Plovdiv City Garden.  A street in Plovdiv was named after captain Burago.  In November 2006, along with several other prominent personalities, Aleksandr Burago was, "for exceptional service in development of the city of Plovdiv" posthumously awarded the title of "Honorary citizen of Plovdiv", by decision of the local community council.

See also 
 Battle of Philippopolis

References 

 — Captain Burago street
 — account of the liberation of Plovdiv
 — citizens of Plovdiv at the traditional annual celebration commemorating the liberation, laying wreaths at the monument to captain Burago
 — Citation for the St. George Order award
 — Decision to award the title of honorary citizen of Plovdiv

External links 
(in Russian) People, animals, alcohol — account of the liberation of Plovdiv by captain Burago's squadron and the historical origins of giving alcohol to military horses (refers to Burago by the given name "Konstantin" rather than Aleksandr).

1853 births
1883 deaths
Russian military personnel
19th-century deaths from tuberculosis
Tuberculosis deaths in Portugal
Burials at Tikhvin Cemetery